Arena is the sixth studio album by British rock band Asia, released in March 1996 by Bullet Proof Records. Recorded at Electric Palace Studios in London during 1995, it was produced by vocalist John Payne and keyboard player Geoff Downes. The album was a departure from Asia's usual sound, adopting a more acoustic production style with Latin and Middle Eastern influences.

Background 
Asia's previous album, Aria, received little promotion due to low sales figures, leading to dwindling audience turnouts during the 1994 tour. Motivated by this, Geoff Downes and John Payne opted to take the followup in a new, bold direction to salvage things. Steve Howe was contacted to return for recording sessions, but was unable to join due to his obligations with Yes at the time. John Payne, Elliot Randall, and Aziz Ibrahim each shared guitar duties on the album. Through this, a Latin-influenced sound began to emerge during jam sessions, which the band felt was the new direction they'd been looking for. A conscious effort was also made to put longer, more progressive pieces into the music, which emerged in the form of "The Day Before the War" and "U Bring Me Down". In order to meet the album's release deadline, Downes and Payne would sometimes spend 15 hours a day recording and mixing to prevent compromising the finished product.

During the group's Christmas holiday break in 1995, a pipe had burst in the Electric Palace studio, destroying thousands of dollars of equipment. Upon returning in January of 1996, it was discovered that a box of tapes filled with unused material had survived among the wreckage. This led to the release of Archiva 1 and Archiva 2 later that year, the latter of which contained the song "That Season", originally meant for inclusion on Arena.

Reception 
Arena received mixed to positive reviews. Music critic Phil VanHelden praised the album, stating "Asia returns true to their traditional form, with an upbeat tempo, heavy synthesizer usage, and catchy vocals. [...] Although I would not consider this as their best release to date, it is extremely close and a very well done CD." Sputnikmusic praised the production and songwriting, but criticized John Payne's vocals and the album's length. Gary Hill of Allmusic believed the album lacked a clear direction, while noting that it dropped the "slick and almost contrived texture" of Asia's previous work.

Track listing

Personnel

Asia
 Geoff Downes – keyboards; producer
 John Payne – vocals (tracks 2-11), solo guitar (tracks 3, 8, 10), acoustic guitar (track 5), bass (tracks 2-8, 10-11); producer, engineer
 Michael Sturgis – drums (tracks 2-11)

Additional Musicians
 Aziz Ibrahim – rhythm guitar (tracks 3-6, 8, 10, 11), lead guitar (track 5), acoustic guitar (track 8), guitar (track 9)
 Elliott Randall – acoustic guitar (tracks 1, 3), guitar (tracks 2, 7), lead guitar (tracks 4, 6, 10, 11)
 Hotei Tomoyasu – lead guitar (track 1)
 Luis Jardim – percussion (tracks 1, 2, 4)

Technical personnel
 John Brough – engineer
 Rodney Matthews – cover artwork
 Roger Dean – Asia logotype
 Brian Burrows – sleeve layout/design

Charts

References

Asia (band) albums
1996 albums
Albums produced by John Payne (singer)
Albums produced by Geoff Downes
Albums with cover art by Rodney Matthews